Goodingia is a genus of sea snails, marine gastropod mollusks in the family Eulimidae.

Species

There are two known species within this genus of gastropods, these include the following:
 Goodingia capillastericola (Minichev, 1970)
 Goodingia varicosa (Schepman, 1909)

References

External links
 To World Register of Marine Species

Eulimidae